= Khar Khedi, Bhopal =

Khar Khedi
- village
- Location within Madhya Pradesh Location within India
- Coordinates: 23.2422861°N 77.2311749°E
- Country: India
- State: Madhya Pradesh
- District: Bhopal
- Tehsil: Huzur
- Elevation: 518 m (1,699 ft)

Population (2011)
  - Total: 347
- Time zone: UTC+5:30 (IST)
- ISO 3166 code: MP-IN
- 2011 census code: 482475

Khar Khedi is a village in the Bhopal district of Madhya Pradesh, India. It is located in the Huzur tehsil and the Phanda block.

== Demographics ==
According to the 2011 census of India, Khar Khedi has 64 households. The effective literacy rate (i.e. the literacy rate of population excluding children aged 6 and below) is 86.97%.

Demographics (2011 Census)
	Total	Male	Female
Population	347	172	175
Children aged below 6 years	40	19	21
Scheduled caste	161	75	86
Scheduled tribe	21	11	10
Literates	267	147	120
Workers (all)	132	93	39
Main workers (total)	132	93	39
Main workers: Cultivators	42	35	7
Main workers: Agricultural labourers	61	31	30
Main workers: Household industry workers	0	0	0
Main workers: Other	29	27	2
Marginal workers (total)	0	0	0
Marginal workers: Cultivators	0	0	0
Marginal workers: Agricultural labourers	0	0	0
Marginal workers: Household industry workers	0	0	0
Marginal workers: Others	0	0	0
Non-workers	215	79	136
